The 1958 Rutgers Scarlet Knights football team represented Rutgers University in the 1958 NCAA University Division football season. In their third season under head coach John Stiegman, the Scarlet Knights compiled an 8–1 record, outscored their opponents 301 to 77, and were ranked No. 20 in the final AP Poll. The team's statistical leaders included Bruce Webster with 513 passing yards, Billy Austin with 747 rushing yards, and Bob Simms with 468 receiving yards.

In the first year of football competition for the Middle Atlantic Conference, Rutgers was undefeated against University Division opponents. The Scarlet Knights also went 2–0 against the Middle Three, beating both Lafayette and Lehigh.

Schedule

References

Rutgers
Rutgers
Rutgers Scarlet Knights football seasons
Rutgers Scarlet Knights football